Bhilori is a Bhil language of India. There are 100,000 speakers of each of the two varieties, Dungra and Noiri, which are highly intelligible with each other.

Noiri is one of the Scheduled Tribes of India.

References

Languages of India
Bhil